Phomatosphaeropsis is a genus of fungi in the family Botryosphaeriaceae containing the single species Phomatosphaeropsis pinicola.

External links
 Index Fungorum

Botryosphaeriaceae
Monotypic fungi genera